Wallace Fortuna dos Santos (born 14 October 1994), known as simply Wallace, is a Brazilian professional footballer who currently plays for Chinese Super League club Wuhan Three Towns as a centre-back.

Club career
A youth product of Cruzeiro, Wallace caused great stir when football agent Jorge Mendes's Gestifute paid €9.5 million to sign him from Cruzeiro in early July 2014. However, as his registration rights as a footballer must owned by a football club, Wallace was "signed" by S.C. Braga which owned 10% economic rights (for the future transfer fee), with a release clause at €40 million.

On 21 August 2014, without ever playing for Braga, he was loaned to AS Monaco, in a loan deal set by Jorge Mendes.

On 29 July 2016, Serie A club Lazio announced that they had definitively purchased Wallace from Braga for €8 million. He scored his first goal for the club on 20 November 2016 in a 3–1 home win over Genoa.

On 30 September 2020, Wallace joined Turkish Süper Lig club Yeni Malatyaspor. On 26 January 2022, his contract with Yeni Malatyaspor was terminated by mutual consent.

On 15 February 2022, Wallace joined Chinese Super League club Wuhan Three Towns. Throughout the season he would be part of the squad that won the 2022 Chinese Super League title.

International career
Wallace represented the Brazil U-20 at the 2013 and 2014 editions of the Toulon Tournament.

Career statistics

Club

Honours

Club
Cruzeiro
Campeonato Brasileiro Série A: 2013
Campeonato Mineiro: 2014

Lazio
Supercoppa Italiana: 2017
Coppa Italia: 2018–19

Wuhan Three Towns
Chinese Super League: 2022.

Country
Brazil U20
Toulon Tournament: 2013, 2014

References

External links
 

1994 births
Living people
Footballers from Rio de Janeiro (city)
Association football central defenders
Brazilian footballers
Brazilian expatriate footballers
Cruzeiro Esporte Clube players
S.C. Braga players
S.S. Lazio players
AS Monaco FC players
Yeni Malatyaspor footballers
Wuhan Three Towns F.C. players
Campeonato Brasileiro Série A players
Primeira Liga players
Ligue 1 players
Serie A players
Süper Lig players
Chinese Super League players
Expatriate footballers in Portugal
Expatriate footballers in Monaco
Expatriate footballers in Italy
Expatriate footballers in Turkey
Expatriate footballers in China
Brazilian expatriate sportspeople in Portugal
Brazilian expatriate sportspeople in Monaco
Brazilian expatriate sportspeople in Italy
Brazilian expatriate sportspeople in Turkey
Brazilian expatriate sportspeople in China